Josef Zezulka (30 March 1912 – 13 December 1992) was a Czech philosopher, healer and the founder of the discipline of biotronics. He wrote many philosophical works, best known of which is BYTÍ - EXISTENCE - A Philosophy for Life, which encompasses topics such as the birth of space and its life, evolution of a being, karma, vegetarianism and life energetics.

Biography

Zezulka was born in Brno on 30 March 1912, but lived in Prague for his whole life. He ran a sweet shop before the Second World War. During the war he was involved in the Western resistance, and after the 1948 Czechoslovak coup d'état his sweet shop was confiscated. He worked as an accountant in the National Museum and later, as a result of further persecution, as a museum guard. 

In 1968, with the assistance of the Czechoslovak Minister of Health, Vlček, biotronics came close to being incorporated into the national healthcare system, but was interrupted by the August 1968 occupation by the Warsaw Pact allied forces. In 1982 Josef Zezulka conducted research into biotronics treatment in the Vimperk hospital, managed by the Psychoenergetic Laboratory of Professor Kahuda. Josef Zezulka practised his methods mainly in his own flat. He practised healing for more than 40 years.

His lectures on the philosophy of existence were not favoured by the communist authorities, and took place mostly in private flats. One exception was a speech he gave at the International Congress on Psychotronic Research held in Prague in 1973. His essays were also published in western countries within various publications. His philosophical-religious books were published only after 1989. He died in 1992.

Publication activities
Prior to November 1989 none of his books could be officially published in Czechoslovakia. They have been progressively published since 1990 by the Publishing House Tomáš Pfeiffer - Dimenze 2+2, Praha:
 ZEZULKA Josef, Bytí životní filosofie [BYTÍ - EXISTENCE - A Philosophy for Life], Dimenze 2+2, 2012,  
 ZEZULKA Josef, Přednášky I [Lectures I], Dimenze 2+2, 2001,  
 ZEZULKA Josef, Přednášky II [Lectures II], Dimenze 2+2, 2014,  
 ZEZULKA Josef, Odpovědi [Answers], Dimenze 2+2, 2014,

References

External links 

 collected by Tomáš Pfeiffer, Zezulkova Biotronika [Zezulka’s Biotronics], Dimenze 2+2, 2012,  http://www.dub.cz/cs/zezulkova-biotronika-online-kniha.php 
 https://theses.cz/id/aah71i/fenomn_litelstv_-_cd_verze.pdf, p. 16 
  
 

1912 births
1992 deaths
Esotericists
Czech Esperantists
20th-century Czech philosophers
Czech philosophers
People in alternative medicine